Tucznawa (until 1960 called Tuczna Baba) is a district of the city of Dąbrowa Górnicza, in Silesian Voivodeship, in southern Poland. It was included within city limits in 1977. It is located 11.5 km south-east from the city centre and along the route Dąbrowa Górnicza – Zawiercie. Its neighbouring districts are: Sikorka and Bugaj. Tucznawa itself is divided into a few smaller parts: Smardz, Piaski, Rogatka, New Bugaj and Przymiarki  (some sources recognize the last as a separate district). The majority of buildings in the district are single-family homes of country temper, with neighbouring gardens.

History 
The original name of the district (village) is Tuczno Baba (Tuczno Baba) or Tuczna Baba (which means fat woman). The first records about the village are from 1298. In the late 13th century it was a part of the parish in Sławków. It had stayed in that parish until 1495, when it was moved to the newly-arisen parish in Chruszczobród. Tucznawa was mentioned in  Liber Beneficiorum Dioecesis Cracoviensis by Polish medieval chronicler, Jan Długosz. In the mid-15th century it was a property of bishops of Cracow and it was a part of clavis Slavcoviensis  (bishop's estates of Sławków) until 1790. Within the Kingdom of Poland, it was administratively located in the Kraków Voivodeship in the Lesser Poland Province of the Polish Crown.

The railroad of Warsaw–Vienna railway (Kolej Warszawsko-Wiedeńska) runs through the district (the closest station is Dąbrowa Górnicza Sikorka).

Since 1912 Tucznawa had been a part of Łosień commune and after the World War II it became a part of Ząbkowice common. In 1975 it had been attached to the town of Ząbkowice and later it was attached to Dąbrowa Górnicza on 1 February 1977.

The Volunteer fire department of Tucznawa was established in August 1928. On 9 September the first fire group consisting of 41 volunteer members was created. In 1953 the local fire department (OSP) received its first banner funded by inhabitants of the village (with the title Tuczna Baba). In 1978 to celebrate 50 years of activity, the OSP received a new banner.

In September 1939, during the German invasion of Poland, which started World War II, German troops committed a massacre of 14 Polish boy scouts from nearby Ogrodzieniec and Złoty Potok in the settlement (see Nazi crimes against the Polish nation). The town was afterwards occupied by Germany until 1945.

On 19 January 1985 Stanisław Nowak, the bishop of Częstochowa founded a parish of Tucznawa dedicated to the Transfiguration. The first parish priest was Stanisław Sikorski.

Curiosities 
There is a small chapel from the 19th century located in the centre of the district. Its construction is partially wooden and partially built of stone.
In February 1863 a small detachment of insurgents had a camp near that chapel. Their task was to demount the railway track in order to break communication. The number of inhabitants helped them in the action.

In the area of Primary School No 23 there are remains of monument commemorating aviator major Ludwik Idzikowski. The monument was uncovered on 17 July 1929. During the World War II it was destroyed by German Nazi soldiers. Only the stone and a board remained. In 2010 the monument was rebuilt.

Inscriptions on the plaque on the front side of the monument tell:

For the glory 
of Poland's name
he died during his flight
over Atlantic
on 13 July 1929

The Trzebyczka river flows through Tucznawa. Water in this small stream appears only after a strong rain and during melt in spring. However the underground water streams cause undermining of the main street which is a significant problem of the district.

The theatrical and film actor Czesław Przybyła had been born and was buried in Tucznawa.
Contemporary Królewska Street (Royal Street) was a section of old “bishop road” connecting Siewierz to Sławków and Cracow.

The relics of Saint Faustyna Kowalska are stored in the church of Tucznawa.

Sport 
Tucznawa has its own football club, named UKS Zagłębiak Tucznawa. Currently it plays in B-class (sub-area of Sosnowiec). The club plays its matches at the local stadium.

See also 
 Batalionów Chłopskich 
 Dąbrowszczaków

References

Dąbrowa Górnicza
Neighbourhoods in Poland
Nazi war crimes in Poland